This is a list of Old Etonians (former pupils of Eton College) who are notable because of their time in any of the armed services, whether those of the United Kingdom and its predecessor states (England, Scotland, Ireland and Great Britain), or of other countries of the British Empire and Commonwealth such as Australia, New Zealand, and British India, or of foreign countries.

Recipients of the Victoria Cross
Thirty-seven Old Etonians have been awarded the Victoria Cross, and the conflicts in which they performed those acts range from the Crimean War to the Falklands War. There have also been four Old Etonians eligible for the George Cross, although one of those eligible did not convert his Empire Gallantry Medal to a George Cross.
Victoria Cross
Crimean War
 Lieutenant-General Lord Henry Percy VC, (1817–1877)
 Lieutenant-Colonel Sir Charles Russell, VC (1826–1883) and politician
 Gerald Goodlake VC, (1832–1890)
 Robert James Loyd-Lindsay, 1st Baron Wantage, VC (1832–1901), and politician
Indian Mutiny
 Lieutenant-General Sir Charles Fraser VC, (1829–1895)
 Clement Walker Heneage, VC (1831–1901)
 Field Marshal Frederick Sleigh Roberts, 1st Earl Roberts VC, (1832–1914), Commander-in-Chief, Madras, 1881–1885, India, 1885–1893, Ireland, 1895–1899, and South Africa, 1899–1900, Commander-in-Chief, 1901–1904,
Umbeyla Expedition
 George Fosbery (1832–1907), VC and firearms expert
Zulu War
 General Sir Redvers Buller, VC  (1839–1908), Adjutant General, 1890–1897, General Officer Commanding Natal, 1899–1900, and I Corps, 1901–1906,
 Lord William Beresford, VC (1847–1900)
 Sudan Campaign
 Admiral of the Fleet Sir Arthur Knyvet Wilson VC, (1842–1921), Third Sea Lord, 1897–1901, Flag Officer Commanding Channel Squadron, 1901–1908, and Home Fleet, 1903–1907, First Sea Lord, 1909–1912
 William Edwards VC, (1855–1912)
 Brigadier General Alexander Hore-Ruthven, 1st Earl of Gowrie, VC (1872–1955), Governor of South Australia, 1928–1934, and New South Wales, 1935–1936, Governor-General of Australia, 1936–1944.
Malakand Campaign
 Alexander Murray, 8th Earl of Dunmore VC, (1871–1962)
Boer War
 Charles FitzClarence, VC (1865–1914)
 Frederick Roberts, VC (1872–1899)
Somaliland Campaign
 Major-General Sir John Gough VC, (1871–1915)
First World War
 Brigadier-General John Campbell VC, (1876–1944)
 George Boyd-Rochfort VC, (1880–1940)
 Francis Grenfell VC, (1880–1915)
 Arthur Batten-Pooll VC, (1891–1971),
 William Congreve VC, (1891–1916)
 Reginald Graham VC, (1892–1980)
 John Dunville VC, (1896–1917)
 Julian Royds Gribble VC, (1897–1918)
Lieutenant-Colonel Lewis Pugh Evans VC, (1881–1962)
Lieutenant-Colonel Arthur Borton VC,  (1883–1933)
Lieutenant-Colonel Neville Elliott-Cooper VC,  (1889–1918)
Lieutenant Geoffrey Drummond VC,  RNVR (1886–1941)
Captain Percy Hansen VC,  (1890–1951)
North West Frontier
Godfrey Meynell VC, (1904–1935)
Second World War
William Sidney, 1st Viscount De L'Isle VC, (1909–1991)
Christopher Furness VC, (1912–1940)
Charles Anthony Lyell, 2nd Baron Lyell VC, (1913–1943)
Geoffrey Keyes VC, (1917–1941)
David Jamieson VC, (1920–2001)
Falklands War
H. Jones VC, (1940–1982)

Recipients of the George Cross
Squadron Leader G. C. N. Close GC RAF
Cadet D.G.M. Hay GC RNR (later 12th Marquess of Tweeddale)
Squadron Leader A. H. H. Tollemache GC, R.Aux.A.F.
Eligible but did not convert Empire Gallantry Medal
Flying Officer G. R. Branch, RAF

Indian Army
Paramasiva Prabhakar Kumaramangalam, Chief of Staff of the Indian Army (1967–1970)

References

 
Etonians in the Military